Diogo Ferreira Tribolet de Abreu (born 5 September 1993) is an American-born Portuguese trampoline gymnast. He competed in the trampoline competition at the 2016 Summer Olympics, where he was eliminated in the qualification round. At club level, he represents Sporting CP.

References

Living people
1993 births
People from Stanford, California
Portuguese male trampolinists
Gymnasts at the 2016 Summer Olympics
Olympic gymnasts of Portugal
European Games competitors for Portugal
Gymnasts at the 2019 European Games
Gymnasts at the 2020 Summer Olympics

American people of Portuguese descent